Jean-Guy Bouchard is a Canadian actor from Quebec. He is most noted for his role as Tonio in the film Requiem for a Handsome Bastard (Requiem pour un beau sans-coeur), for which he received a Genie Award nomination for Best Supporting Actor at the 13th Genie Awards in 1992.

A 1979 graduate of the National Theatre School of Canada, he began his acting career in 1980 in a production of David Fennario's play Nothing to Lose.

His other credits have included the films The Years of Dreams and Revolt (Les Années de rêves), Phantom Life (La Vie fantôme), Karmina, Heads or Tails (J'en suis !), The Revenge of the Woman in Black (La Vengeance de la femme en noir), It's Your Turn, Laura Cadieux (C't'à ton tour, Laura Cadieux), The Sleep Room, When I Will Be Gone (L'Âge de braise), Post Mortem, The Collector (Le Collectionneur), The Negro (Le Nèg'), May God Bless America (Que Dieu bénisse l'Amérique), Thrill of the Hills (Frisson des collines), French Immersion, Death Dive (Le Scaphandrier) and Boundaries (Pays).

On stage he is most noted for Centaur Theatre's 2000 production of Michel Tremblay's For the Pleasure of Seeing Her Again at the Arena Stage in Washington, D.C., and for the 2018 production of Fabien Cloutier's Bonne retraite, Jocelyne. He has also translated foreign-language plays into French for production on Quebec stages, most notably Paul Pörtner's Shear Madness in 1988.

References

External links

20th-century Canadian male actors
21st-century Canadian male actors
Canadian male film actors
Canadian male stage actors
Canadian male television actors
Canadian translators
French Quebecers
Male actors from Montreal
National Theatre School of Canada alumni
Living people
Year of birth missing (living people)